The Extraliga rugby is a rugby club competition played in the Czech Republic and is the top level of rugby in the country. There is a promotion-relegation process between the Extraliga ragby and the Národní liga ragby.
The league used to be known as KB Extraliga due to sponsorship by Komerční banka (KB) which lasted until the 2014/15 season.

The season usually runs from September to May, although in the 2008 season, it was only from August through November 2008. Since 2008 the final has been played at the Synot Tip Arena in Prague.

RC Sparta Prague are the current champions.

History
The league was first played in 1993, with Vyškov as the first champions. Prior to the foundation of the league, clubs competed in the Czechoslovak Championship.

It became known under the KB Extraliga name in 2003, when KB started sponsoring the Czech Rugby Union, as well as the national teams and leagues. For the 2016/17 season the name changed to Extraliga ragby in line with the Czech rugby union league system restructure.

Current teams
2020 season

Results
The scores in blue are links to accounts of finals on the site of the Czech Rugby Union (ČSRU) - in Czech

Performance by club

Regions 
The following table lists the Czech rugby champions by region.

Notes

See also
 Rugby union in the Czech Republic

External links
 80 let Českého Ragby 1926-2006 (80 years of Czech Rugby 1926-2006)

 
National rugby union premier leagues
Cze
Rugby union competitions in the Czech Republic
1993 establishments in the Czech Republic
Rugby union 
Sports leagues established in 1993
Professional sports leagues in the Czech Republic